Eddy Nait Slimani (born 25 August 1993) is a French kickboxer. He is a former WKN and WAKO-Pro world champion.

As of July 2021, he was the #9 ranked Featherweight in the world by Combat Press.

Professional kickboxing career
Nait Slimani made his professional debut against Hamza Essalih at Stars Night in January 2013. He won the fight by decision.  Nait Slimani won his next fight against Jordi Fernaandez in the same manner. In October 2013, Slimani took part in the World GBC Tour 5 tournament. He defeated  Alessandro Alias by decision in the semifinals, and  Mohamed Galaoui by decision in the finals.

Nait Slimani won his next three fights in a row, against Mehdi Traia, Anthony Recio and Soufiane Hammani. He then participated in the Simply The Boxe four man tournament. In the semifinals, he beat William Saidi by first-round knockout, and won the tournament with a decision win against Vang Moua.

After his second tournament win, Nait Slimani was scheduled to fight Edson Fortes at La Nuit des Gladiateurs, and won the fight by decision. He was subsequently scheduld to fight Allan Gozdzicki for the WKN European 64.5 kg title.  Nait Slimani beat Gozdzicki by decision. Following a successful title defense against Antoine Habash at World GBC Tour 8, Nait Slimani took part in the 2015 Simply The Boxe four man tournament. He beat Franck Reoutzkoff by knockout in the semifinals, and Yohann Drai by split decision in the finals.

In May 2015, Nait Slimani suffered the first loss of his professional career, losing to Cedric Castagna by decision. The two of them then fought an immediate rematch, with Nait Slimani winning by decision. Nait Slimani was then scheduled to fight Antonio Campoy at Battle of Saint-Raphael 3 for the WKN International -66.7 kg title. He knocked Campoy out in the first round.
 
Nait Slimani participated in his second World GBC Tour four man tournament, and faced Cosmin Podoriu in the semifinal. Nait Slimani beat him by decision, and won the tournament with a second-round TKO of Houcine Bennoui.

After a decision victory over Samir Mohamed, Nait Slimani signed a one-year contract with Glory. In his first fight, Slimani fought Maykol Yurk at Glory 28: Paris, and won by decision. Slimani afterwards beat  Stephane Candel and Mehdi Berisha by decision. In his second Glory fight, Nait Slimani fought the muay thai legend Saenchai at Glory 31: Amsterdam.

Nait Slimani was scheduled to fight Mathieu Bernard at World GBC Tour 11, and won by decision. He was then scheduled to fight Masaaki Noiri for the NDC 66 kg title. Noiri won the fight by knockout, in the very last seconds of the fight.

In his next fight, Nait Slimani fought Modibo Diarra at Stars Night, and won by decision. At ACB KB 9: Showdown in Paris, he fought David Mejia. Nait Slimani defeated Mejia by decision.
 
At Capital Fights 2, Nait Slimani challenged Yannick Reine for the ISKA K-1 World 63.5 kg title. Reine successfully defended the title, winning by decision.

During the 2017 Monte-Carlo Fighting Trophy event, Nait Slimani fought a rematch with Antoine Habash, for the WAKO Pro World -64.5 kg title. Nait Slimani once again won, beating Habash by a second-round knockout.

Nait Slimani was scheduled to fight Dong-Su Kim at World GBC Tour 12, for the WKN World -64.5 kg title. He knocked Kim out in the first round, with a head kick.
 
Slimani fought Karim Bennoui at Nuit Des Champions 2017, and won the fight by decision. He won his next three fights, winning decisions against Charlie Peters, Khyzer Hayat Nawaz and Denis Wosik. His six fight winning streak was snapped at Enfusion 60, during which he lost an extra round decision in a rematch with Hamza Essalih.

In November 2018, Slimani fought Daniel Puertas Gallardo for the vacant La Nuit des Champions -65 kg title. He beat Gallardo by split decision. In his next fight, he fought Yvan Naccari and won by majority decision. Slimani defended his NDC title for the first time against Sergey Kulyaba in November 2019, and won the fight by split decision.

Slimani was scheduled to fight Adam Noi, at Arena Fight Championship 2, for the inaugural Arena Fight K-1 -65 kg title. The entire event was later postponed, due to the COVID-19 pandemic.

Nait Slimani was scheduled to face Hayat Khyzer at La Nuit Des Gladiateurs 12 on September 18, 2021. He won the fight by decision.

In the fall of 2021, Nait Slimani signed with the Superkombat Fighting Championship. He made his promotional debut at Superkombat Universe on November 1, 2021, against Mo Monteur for the world super lightweight title. Slimani lost the fight by a first-round knockout.

Slimani made his second Nuit des Champions -65kg title defense against Anass Ahmidouch at La Nuit Des Champions 29 on November 19, 2022. He lost the fight by decision.

Slimani faced Said Ahamada at Fight Night One on March 4, 2023.

Titles and achievements

Amateur
 5x French National Kickboxing Champion (2007, 2008, 2009, 2010, 2012)
 5x French National Full Contact Champion (2007, 2008, 2009, 2010, 2012)
 International Sport Kickboxing Association
 2010 ISKA World Championships Light Contact -63.5 kg 
 2010 ISKA World Championships Semi Contact -63.5 kg 
 International Kickboxing Federation
 2011 IKF Junior Full Contact European -60 kg Champion
 2012 IKF Full Contact European -64,5 kg Champion
 World Association of Kickboxing Organizations
 2012 WAKO Wold Cup Full Contact -63,5 kg 
 World Kickboxing Network
 2013 WKN K-1 European -63.5 kg Champion

Professional
World GBC Tour
2014 World GBC Tour 4-Man 65 kg Tournament Winner
2015 World GBC Tour 4-Man 65 kg Tournament Winner
Simply The Boxe
2014 Simply The Boxe 4-Man 65 kg Tournament Winner
2015 Simply The Boxe 4-Man 65 kg Tournament Winner
 World Kickboxing Network
 2014 WKN European -64.5 kg Champion (one defense)
 2015 WKN International -66.7 kg Champion
 2017 WKN World Oriental Rules -64.5 kg Champion
 World Association of Kickboxing Organizations
 2017 WAKO Pro World -64.5 kg K-1 Champion
 La Nuit des Champions
2018 La Nuit des Champions -65 kg Champion (one defence)

Fight record

|- style="background:#;"
| 2023-04-29 || ||align=left| Said Ahamada || Fight Night One || Chalon-sur-Saône, France ||  ||  ||

|- style="text-align:center; background:#fbb;"
|  2022-11-19 || Loss || align="left" | Anass Ahmidouch || La Nuit Des Champions 29 || Marseille, France || Decision || 5 || 3:00
|-
! style=background:white colspan=9 |

|- style="text-align:center; background:#cfc;"
|  2022-05-21 || Win || align="left" | Nacho Menen || Stars Night 2022 || Vitrolles, France || Decision || 3 || 3:00

|- style="text-align:center; background:#cfc;"
|  2022-04-22 || Win || align="left" | Mikel Sortino || La Nuit Des Gladiateurs 13 || Marseille, France || Decision (Unanimous) || 3 || 3:00

|- align="center"  bgcolor="#fbb"
|  2021-11-01 || Loss || align="left" | Mohamed El Mesbahi || Superkombat Universe || Dubai, UAE || KO (left head kick) || 1 || 1:14
|-
! style=background:white colspan=9 |
|-  style="text-align:center; background:#cfc;"
| 2021-09-18|| Win ||align=left| Khyzer Hayat || La Nuit Des Gladiateurs 12 || Marseille, France || Decision || 3 || 3:00

|-  style="text-align:center; background:#cfc;"
| 2019-11-16|| Win ||align=left| Sergey Kulyaba || La Nuit Des Champions || Marseille, France || Decision (Split) || 5 || 3:00
|-
! style=background:white colspan=9 |

|-  style="text-align:center; background:#cfc;"
| 2019-10-12 ||Win ||align=left| Yvan Naccari || World GBC Tour 14 ||  Mazan, France || Decision (Majority) || 3 || 3:00

|- align="center" bgcolor="#cfc"
| 2018-11-24 || Win ||align=left| Daniel Puertas Gallardo || La Nuit Des Champions || Marseille, France || Decision (Split) || 5 || 3:00
|-
! style=background:white colspan=9 |

|- align="center"  bgcolor="#fbb"
| 2018-10-27 || Loss ||align=left| Hamza Essalih || Enfusion Talents #60 || Oberhausen, Germany  || Ext.R Decision  || 4 ||  3:00

|-  style="text-align:center; background:#cfc;"
| 2018-10-13 ||Win ||align=left| Denis Wosik || World GBC Tour 13 ||  Mazan, France || Decision (Unanimous) || 3 || 3:00

|-  style="text-align:center; background:#cfc;"
| 2018-05-26 ||Win ||align=left| Khyzer Hayat Nawaz|| Octogone 2 ||  Marseille, France || Decision (Unanimous) || 3 || 3:00

|-  style="text-align:center; background:#cfc;"
| 2018-01-13 ||Win ||align=left| Charlie Peters || Nuit des Gladiateurs 9 ||  Marseille, France || Decision  || 3 || 3:00

|-align="center"  bgcolor="#cfc"
| 2017-11-25|| Win ||align=left| Karim Bennoui  || Nuit Des Champions 2017 || Marseille, France  || Decision  || 3 || 3:00

|-align="center"  bgcolor="#cfc"
| 2017-10-14|| Win ||align=left| Dong-Su Kim  || World GBC Tour 12 || Mazan, France  || KO (Right High Kick) || 1 ||
|-
! style=background:white colspan=9 |

|-align="center"  bgcolor="#cfc"
| 2017-06-30|| Win ||align=left| Antoine Habash  || Monte-Carlo Fighting Trophy || Monaco, France  || KO (Jumping back Kick) || 2 || 2:03
|-
! style=background:white colspan=9 |

|- align="center" bgcolor="#fbb"
| 2017-05-20 || Loss ||align=left| Yannick Reine || Capital Fights 2 || Paris, France || Decision || 5 || 3:00
|-
! style=background:white colspan=9 |

|-  style="text-align:center; background:#cfc;"
| 2017-03-25 || Win ||align=left| David Mejia || ACB KB 9: Showdown in Paris || Paris, France || Decision (Unanimous) || 3 || 3:00

|-  style="text-align:center; background:#cfc;"
| 2017-02-11 || Win ||align=left| Modibo Diarra || Stars Night || Vitrolles, France || Decision || 3 || 3:00

|- style="text-align:center; background:#fbb;"
| 2016-11-19 || Loss ||align=left| Masaaki Noiri || Nuit Des Champions 2016 || Marseille, France || KO (Left Knee to The Body) || 3 ||2:57
|-
! style=background:white colspan=9 |

|-align="center"  bgcolor="#cfc"
| 2016-10-08|| Win ||align=left| Mathieu Bernard  || World GBC Tour 11 || Mazan, France  || Decision || 3 || 3:00

|-  style="text-align:center; background:#fbb;"
| 2016-06-25|| Loss ||align=left| Saenchai || Glory 31: Amsterdam || Amsterdam, Netherlands || Decision (Unanimous) || 3 || 3:00

|-align="center"  bgcolor="#cfc"
| 2016-04-06|| Win ||align=left| Mehdi Berisha  || Fight Night 1 || Saint-Étienne, France  || Decision || 3 || 3:00

|-align="center"  bgcolor="#cfc"
| 2016-03-26|| Win ||align=left|  Stephane Candel || World GBC Tour 10 || France  || Decision || 3 || 3:00

|-  style="text-align:center; background:#cfc;"
| 2016-03-12|| Win ||align=left| Maykol Yurk || Glory 28: Paris || Paris, France || Decision (Unanimous) || 3 || 3:00

|-  style="text-align:center; background:#cfc;"
| 2015-11-14 || Win ||align=left| Samir Mohamed ||  Nuit des Champions 2015 || Marseille, France || KO (Punch) || 1 ||

|-  style="text-align:center; background:#cfc;"
| 2015-10-10 || Win ||align=left| Houcine Bennoui || World GBC Tour 9, Final || Mazan, France || TKO (Punches) || 2 ||
|-
! style=background:white colspan=9 |

|-  style="text-align:center; background:#cfc;"
| 2015-10-10 || Win ||align=left| Cosmin Podoriu || World GBC Tour 9, Semi Final || Mazan, France || Decision || 3 || 3:00

|-  style="text-align:center; background:#cfc;"
| 2015-09-12 || Win ||align=left|  Antonio Campoy || Battle of Saint-Raphael 3 || Saint-Raphaël, Var, France || KO || 1 ||
|-
! style=background:white colspan=9 |

|-  style="text-align:center; background:#cfc;"
| 2015-06-26 || Win ||align=left| Cedric Castagna || La Nuit des Gladiateurs || Marseille, France || Decision || 3 || 3:00

|-  style="text-align:center; background:#fbb;"
| 2015-05-23 || Loss ||align=left| Cedric Castagna || IXeme Tophée des Etoiles || Aix-en-Provence, France || Decision || 3 || 3:00

|-  style="text-align:center; background:#cfc;"
| 2015-04-18 || Win ||align=left| Yohann Drai ||  Simply The Boxe, Final || France || Decision (Split) || 3 || 3:00
|-
! style=background:white colspan=9 |

|-  style="text-align:center; background:#cfc;"
| 2015-04-18 || Win ||align=left| Franck Reoutzkoff ||  Simply The Boxe, Semi Final || France || KO (Hook) || 2 ||

|-align="center"  bgcolor="#cfc"
| 2015-02-07|| Win ||align=left| Antoine Habash ||  World GBC Tour 8 || France  || TKO (Corner Stoppage) || 3 || 3:00
|-
! style=background:white colspan=9 |

|-  style="text-align:center; background:#cfc;"
| 2014-11-22 || Win ||align=left| Samir Mohamed ||  Nuit des Champions 2014 || Marseille, France || Decision || 3 || 3:00

|-align="center"  bgcolor="#cfc"
| 2014-10-04|| Win ||align=left| Allan Gozdzicki ||  World GBC Tour 7 || Mazan, France  || Decision || 3 || 3:00
|-
! style=background:white colspan=9 |

|-align="center"  bgcolor="#cfc"
| 2014-06-27|| Win ||align=left| Edson Fortes ||  La Nuit des Gladiateurs || Marseille, France  || Decision || 3 || 3:00

|- align="center"  bgcolor="#cfc"
| 2014-04-12 || Win ||align=left| Vang Moua  || Simply The Boxe, Final || La Penne-sur-Huveaune, France || Decision || 3 || 3:00
|-
! style=background:white colspan=9 |

|- align="center"  bgcolor="#cfc"
| 2014-04-12 || Win ||align=left| William Saidi  || Simply The Boxe, Semi Final || La Penne-sur-Huveaune, France || KO || 1 ||

|-align="center"  bgcolor="#cfc"
| 2014-02-15|| Win ||align=left|  Soufiane Hammani ||  World GBC Tour 6 || France  || Decision || 3 || 3:00

|-align="center"  bgcolor="#cfc"
| 2013-12-20|| Win ||align=left| Anthony Recio || Fight Night || Marseille, France  || Decision || 3 || 3:00

|-align="center"  bgcolor="#cfc"
| 2013-10-26|| Win ||align=left| Mehdi Traia ||  Choc des guerriers 3 || France  || Decision || 3 || 3:00

|-align="center"  bgcolor="#cfc"
| 2013-10-05|| Win ||align=left|  Mohamed Galaoui  ||  World GBC Tour 5, Final || France  || Decision || 3 || 3:00
|-
! style=background:white colspan=9 |

|-align="center"  bgcolor="#cfc"
| 2013-10-05|| Win ||align=left|  Alessandro Alias  ||  World GBC Tour 5, Semi Final || France  || Decision || 3 || 3:00

|-align="center"  bgcolor="#cfc"
| 2013-03-30|| Win ||align=left| Jordi Fernaandez || 10th Trophée de l'Ephèbe de Kick-Boxing || France  || Decision || 3 || 3:00

|- align="center"  bgcolor="#cfc"
| 2013-01-26 || Win ||align=left| Hamza Essalih || Stars Night || Vitrolles, France || Decision  || 3 ||  3:00

|-
| colspan=9 | Legend:    

|-align="center"  bgcolor="#cfc"
| 2013-06-08|| Win ||align=left| Giga Adamshvili  || WKN || Tbilisi, Georgia  || KO || 3 || 
|-
! style=background:white colspan=9 |

|-align="center"  bgcolor="#cfc"
| 2012-06-03|| Win ||align=left| Milton Barrios Galarreta  || WAKO World Cup Bestfighter 2012, Final|| Rimini, Italy  ||  ||  || 
|-
! style=background:white colspan=9 |

|-align="center"  bgcolor="#cfc"
| 2012-06-02|| Win ||align=left|  || WAKO World Cup Bestfighter 2012, Semi Final|| Rimini, Italy  ||  ||  || 

|-align="center"  bgcolor="#cfc"
| 2012-05-19|| Win ||align=left| Dylan Moran  || Ringside promotion - IKF Kickboxing|| Thurles, Ireland  || Decision ||  || 
|-
! style=background:white colspan=9 |

|-align="center"  bgcolor="#cfc"
| 2011-04-15|| Win ||align=left| Dylan O'Connor  || Ringside promotion - IKF Kickboxing|| Thurles, Ireland  || KO || 3 || 
|-
! style=background:white colspan=9 |
|-
| colspan=9 | Legend:

See also 
 List of male kickboxers

References

1993 births
Living people
French male kickboxers
French Muay Thai practitioners
Sportspeople from Vienne, Isère
Glory kickboxers
SUPERKOMBAT kickboxers